The AMF1 Driver Development Programme is a scheme set up by Formula One team Aston Martin in 2022 with the aim of developing future racing drivers.

Current drivers

See also 

 Aston Martin in Formula One

References 

Racing schools
Aston Martin in Formula One